Edward Ralph Dexter,  (15 May 1935 – 25 August 2021) was an England international cricketer.

An aggressive middle-order batsman of ferocious power and a right-arm medium bowler, he captained Sussex and England in the early 1960s. He captained England in 30 test matches out of his 62 test match appearances.

He was known by the nickname Lord Ted. He is credited for his instrumental role in the formation of the modern ICC Player Rankings system. In June 2021, he was inducted into the ICC Cricket Hall of Fame as one of the special inductees to mark the inaugural ICC World Test Championship final.

Biography 
Dexter was born in Milan in Italy, where his father Ralph Dexter ran a successful underwriting agency. He along with his family moved to England when he was aged three just before the start of World War II.

Early career 1953–60

Few batsmen, or writers, announce themselves as Dexter did when batting for Sussex against Surrey at the Oval last summer. His first ball, from the pavilion end, was slightly over-pitched on middle and leg. Feet moved fractionally, head hardly at all, but the bat swung the ball for six over long leg and they fetched it back from the seats under the gasholder.
Wisden, 1961
Dexter was educated at Norfolk House, Beaconsfield, and Radley College, where he played in the first XI from 1950 to 1953, initially as a wicket-keeper and as captain in 1953, and was nicknamed "Lord Ted" by his coach Ivor Gilliat for his aloof self-confidence. His cricket coach at Radley was B H Smithson, father of England cricketer Gerald Smithson. While Dexter was head boy at Radley, Peter Cook, English comedian, satirist, writer and actor, was among those  younger boys upon whom 'a big & strong' Dexter inflicted corporal punishment. He did his national service as a second lieutenant in the 11th Hussars during the Malayan Emergency in 1953–55 and was awarded the Malaya Campaign Medal. Dexter entered Jesus College, Cambridge in October 1955, where he played golf and rugby in addition to winning his cricket Blue and playing in the University Match in 1956, 1957 and (as captain) 1958. He first came to notice as a bowler taking 5/8 and 3/47 for the Gentlemen in 1957 and joined Sussex County Cricket Club in the same year. He made his Test debut in 1958 against New Zealand, made 52 and E. W. Swanton thought that he should have been picked for Peter May's MCC tour of Australia in 1958–59. In the end he was flown from Paris (where his wife was working as a model) to reinforce Peter May's injury-struck team. Dexter arrived in the middle of the tour, did not have time to acclimatize and although he did well in the tour matches he failed in the Tests. Continuing on the tour to New Zealand he made 141, his maiden Test century. After an indifferent summer against India the decision to take him to the Caribbean in 1959–60 was much criticised, but "Lord Ted" made his name thrashing the fast bowlers Wes Hall and Charlie Griffith with his powerful drives. He hit 132 not out in the First Test, 110 in the Fourth Test, made 526 runs (65.75), topping the England batting averages, and was a Wisden Cricketer of the Year in 1961.

Rising star 1960–61

Few hundreds have filled such a yawning gap...Dexter so dominated a stand with Barrington that more than two-thirds of the 161 runs came from his masterful bat before he was stumped trying to lift Simpson's leg-break on to some distant fairway.
Ray Robinson and Mike Coward
On his return Dexter was made captain of Sussex, which he held until he retired in 1965. He had a quiet home Test season against South Africa, but in the First Test at Edgbaston in the 1961 Ashes series England started their second innings needing 321 runs to avoid an innings defeat. Dexter made 180, the biggest century for England against Australia since the war and studded with 31 cracking boundaries, but typically he was stumped in the last minutes of the match trying to hit Bobby Simpson for six so he could make a double century. In the famous Fourth Test at Old Trafford he played a spectacular innings of 76 in 84 minutes to take England to 106 runs from victory with 9 wickets in hand and the Ashes in sight, but his dismissal set off an England collapse and the series was lost.

England captain 1961–62

Ted was a man of moods, often caught up in theories, keen when the action was hot, seemingly uninterested when the game was dull...a big-time player, one who responded to atmosphere, liked action and enjoyed the chase and gamble. Maybe this was the reason he was drawn to horse racing; a dull day stalking the covers might be enlivened for him by thoughts of how his money was faring on the 3:15 at Ascot or Goodwood. 
John Snow
With Peter May and Colin Cowdrey declining to tour India and Pakistan in 1961–62 Dexter was chosen to lead the MCC team. With a weakened team (Fred Trueman and Brian Statham also refused to tour) Dexter beat Pakistan 1–0 but lost to India 2–0, their first series victory over England. He made 712 Test runs (71.20) on the tour, including his highest Test score of 205 at Karachi, and another 446 runs (89.20) when Pakistan toured England in 1962 and were beaten 4–0. Peter May finally declared his retirement in 1962 and the selectors had to choose who would captain the English cricket team in Australia in 1962–63. Dexter captained England in the First and Second Tests against Pakistan, winning two big victories, but Colin Cowdrey was put in charge for the Third Test. Cowdrey had been May's affable vice-captain, had a shrewd cricket brain and was seen as his natural successor, but had inherited his cautious tactics and the Marylebone Cricket Club was crusading for "brighter cricket". Cowdrey withdrew from the final Gentleman v Players match at Lord's because of kidney stones even though he had been appointed captain, which usually indicated the selectors' intentions. Dexter was put back in charge (and drew against Fred Trueman's Players), but found another rival in the old Sussex captain the Reverend David Sheppard, who was willing to take a sabbatical from his church mission in the East End in order to tour Australia. Sheppard made 112 for the Gentlemen and was chosen for the tour, but Dexter was confirmed as captain for the remainder of the home series and the forthcoming tour of Australia and New Zealand with Cowdrey as vice-captain. The general opinion was that England had a good batting side, but their bowling was unvaried, would struggle to dismiss Australia and that the tourists would be lucky to avoid another defeat.

Tour of Australia and New Zealand 1962–63

After his thunderous Melbourne display Dexter was a magnet; the first thing people wanted to know about a team selection was: "Is Dexter playing?"...Batting against South Australia, he lifted the ball onto the high roof of the members stand – a tremendous hit. Some of his drives along the ground just could not be stopped, even when they went straight to a fieldsman.
Tom Goodman

He made 481 runs (48.10), the most runs by an England captain in Australia, and this remains a record. The team manager was Bernard Fitzalan-Howard, 16th Duke of Norfolk, KG, GCVO, PC, Earl Marshal and Chief Butler of England, and it was joked that "Lord Ted" could only be controlled by a duke. In fact, the Duke was the President of Sussex County Cricket Club, had been instrumental in Dexter's appointment as county captain, shared his interests in horse racing and golf and was very popular with the Australian public. In the tour match between the Marylebone Cricket Club (MCC) and an Australian XI Dexter hit 102 in 110 minutes, including 2 sixes and 13 fours. John Woodcock  of The Times wrote "I doubt if it is possible to hit a cricket ball any harder than Dexter did today. Melbourne is a huge ground and no one who hits a six here is likely to forget it. Against Veivers, an off-spinner, Dexter twice cleared the sight screen, once by a good 20 yards." At the Adelaide Oval Dexter included "a six from a gigantic hit onto the roof of the stand – one of the biggest hits ever seen at the ground." He was the main draw in the England team and over a million spectators came to see the tourists, the most since 1936–37. The tour returned a record profit for the Marylebone Cricket Club (MCC) of £24,000, beating the £17,000 of 1946–47. Dexter continued his good run of form to equal Patsy Hendren's England record of six consecutive Test 50s (85 and 172 against Pakistan and 70, 99, 93 and 52 against Australia), which he soon shared with Ken Barrington and more recently Alastair Cook. His powerful innings enlivened the First and Second Tests and gave England a 1–0 lead in the series. Australia came back to win the Third Test at Sydney, where Dexter had preferred to keep his fast bowling attack from the Second Test even when Fred Trueman volunteered to stand down in favour of a second spinner to Fred Titmus. In the end the unsupported Titmus took 7/79 in the first innings and Australia won by 8 wickets, E. W. Swanton and others thought that if either David Allen or Ray Illingworth had been in the team England would have won the Ashes. Even so, the match might have been saved if Dexter had not conceded 27 runs off 26 balls so that the teams would not have to return the next day to finish the game. The last few overs were played in the rain and it rained for most of the fifth day, so England might have won the Ashes. Dexter's negative field placings and lack of urgency failed to regain the Ashes and the painful draws in the Fourth and Fifth Tests particularly spoilt the atmosphere, as Richie Benaud was determined to hold onto the Ashes and Dexter was content to draw a series in Australia. In mitigation the Adelaide pitch was flat as a pancake. The Sydney ground was so saturated in the days before the match that mowing was impossible before the start. The "square" was like one large bunker and the outfield like a meadow. Barely a ball reached the boundary. Benaud was an advocate of "go ahead" captaincy and Dexter for "brighting up" cricket and their reputations were unfairly tarnished.

Home series 1963–64

Ted Dexter elected to lead from the front. We had a disastrous start, with Charlie Griffith blasting out both our openers very cheaply, and Ted unleashing one of his finest displays of controlled aggression I have ever witnessed. His 70 was electrifying. He stood up and hit the quick bowlers all over the show for an hour.
Fred Titmus
As captain against Frank Worrell's West Indian cricket team in England in 1963 Dexter was able to loosen up after the Ashes and they played an exciting Test series. After losing the First Test, in the Second Test at Lord's England's first innings rested heavily on Dexter's hard-hitting 70 off 75 balls when he took on the West Indian fast bowlers Charlie Griffith and Wes Hall in an innings that was remembered by all who saw it. In the second innings Colin Cowdrey came out to bat with a broken arm with victory, defeat or a tie still possible in the last two balls, but David Allen blocked them for a draw. England levelled the series in the Third Test thanks to Dexter (4/38 and 1/7) and Fred Trueman (5/75 and 7/44), but lost the last two Tests and the series. In 1964 Dexter was again in charge in the rain-soaked 1964 Ashes series. Famously in the decisive Third Test at Headingley he removed the off-spinner Fred Titmus after he had taken three wickets to reduce Australia to 187/7, still 81 runs behind England. Dexter took the new ball and gave it to Fred Trueman who bowled a series of bouncers which Peter Burge hooked and pulled to 160, hoisting Australia to 389 and a 7 wicket win. Although the change made sense as the new batsman Neil Hawke was fragile against fast bowling and Trueman, the greatest wicket-taker in the world at the time, was playing on his home ground Dexter was heavily criticised for a decision which obviously lost the series. In the Fourth Test Australia made 656/8, but thanks to a stand of 246 between Ken Barrington (256) and Dexter (174) England reached 611 and avoided defeat. It was the first time that two teams had made 600 runs in an innings in a Test, and their fortunes gripped the cricketing nation, but the inevitable draw meant that Australia retained the Ashes. As some consolation Dexter led Sussex to the finals of the Gillette Cup in 1963 and 1964, and won both, the first trophies in the county's history.

Later career 1965–72

Above all we had Dexter's captaincy. One-day cricket was his kind of game: it was instant and aggressive and its atmosphere brought out the best in him. He really became involved, more so than in county games. He even made a marked difference to our one day performances when he returned for a season of Sunday League games in the early 1970s.
John Snow
Dexter declared himself unavailable for the 1964–65 tour of South Africa as he contested Jim Callaghan's Cardiff South East seat for the Conservative Party in the 1964 General Election. Finding himself free to tour after his defeat he was made vice-captain to M. J. K. Smith, who won the series and continued as captain. His cricket career was virtually ended by an accident in 1965. His Jaguar car ran out of petrol in west London, and he was pushing it to safety when it pinned him to a warehouse door, breaking his leg. He left Sussex and played occasional Sunday games with the International Cavaliers, and made 104 when they defeated the 1966 West Indians by 7 wickets. He returned briefly in 1968, making 203 not out in his comeback match against Kent, but failing in the 1968 Ashes series. He played Sunday League games for Sussex in 1971 and 1972.

Administration 1989–2003

If you are going to lose, you might as well lose good and proper and try to sneak a win.
Ted Dexter
Dexter retired from cricket to concentrate on other interests in 1968, remaining a journalist, becoming a broadcaster and founding a PR company. In the late 1980s he joined Bob Willis to find new fast bowlers for English cricket. Sponsored by a brewery, application forms were sent to pubs to encourage young men, but most were filled in by jokers and drunks and only a few potential candidates were discovered. These were trained with javelin throwing and other exercises to strengthen their back and arm muscles, but the only bowler in the scheme who played first-class cricket had been signed up by Warwickshire before its inception. The plan therefore failed even though it generated much publicity and showed a certain amount of imagination and initiative.

In 1987, Dexter had the idea of developing a ranking system for Test cricketers. He developed the system with statisticians Gordon Vince and Rob Eastaway, and it was launched as the Deloittes Ratings. The Ratings steadily gained credibility, and were formally adopted by the International Cricket Council in 2003, and have become the official ICC Player Rankings.  In an article in The Cricketer magazine in 2005, Dexter was quoted as saying: "The rankings idea was my biggest contribution to cricket.  Much better than being known for hitting a couple of extra-cover drives." Former cricketer and analyst Simon Hughes in his bibliography titled And God Created Cricket noted that Dexter's ideas had shaped modern cricket.

In 1989 he succeeded Peter May as Chairman of the England Cricket Selectors, receiving a modest £18,000 pay to compensate for his lost newspaper contract, the first chairman to be paid. "Dexter was soon in action, initially by way of press conferences and then, as the season developed, by lightning visits to the county grounds. These he made, despite an operation to a heel that put him for a while on crutches, by motorbike and car, a demonstration of enthusiasm and interest that was impressive." After the chaos of 1988 – the so-called Summer of Four Captains – he wanted the tough Mike Gatting as captain, but was vetoed by Ossie Wheatley and his status was immediately undermined. Instead the more relaxed David Gower was appointed for the six-Test series. Dexter tackled the role with energy and enthusiasm, but the shine soon wore off as Allan Border's 1989 Australians beat England 4–0 to regain the Ashes, their first series victory in England since 1975. His cause was not helped by the announcement of the Mike Gatting's rebel tour of South Africa in the middle of the series, which removed more than fifteen England players from contention. Admittedly England were already 2–0 down in the series and none of these players had shown any talent so far in the summer, but it was an indication of the division and demoralisation of English cricket. In the First Test at Headingley Dexter selected four fast bowlers and no spinners for the team, advised Gower to put Australia in to bat, only to see them make 601/7 and win by 210 runs. For the Second Test he wrote an inspirational hymn for the England cricketers to sing called "Onward Gower's Soldiers" (to the tune of "Onward, Christian Soldiers") and appointed a team chaplain, but remained aloof from the players and seldom visited the dressing room. At the end of the summer he told the press that he couldn't think of any mistakes he had made and later joked that the "lines of Venus were in the wrong juxtaposition", which was incorrectly interpreted by the press as a genuine belief in New Age mysticism. The lackadaisical Gower was fired at the end of the summer and the more painstaking Graham Gooch was made captain until 1993, despite Dexter having called his previous appointment as captain as "being hit in the face by a dead fish".

Dexter's tenure as Chairman of Selectors coincided with a poor period in English cricket, but there were some successes; these included the first Test victory over the West Indies for 19 years in 1990, victories over New Zealand and India in the run-laden summer of 1990, and the 2–2 draw with the West Indies in 1991. Against this England suffered two further series defeats to Australia (3–0 in 1990–91 and 4–1 in 1993), and were heavily defeated 3–0 in India in 1992–93, after Gower was controversially dropped from the team. Dexter resigned under a cloud at the end of 1993, but his overhaul of the antiquated structure of English cricket and forward-looking reforms such as the change from three- to four-day county cricket had a significant impact. Richie Benaud commented that the structures he put in place "will be of great of benefit to English cricket in years to come. Equally, I'm in no doubt that others will take the credit for it." He also became president of the Marylebone Cricket Club (MCC), and was chairman of the MCC's cricket committee until 2003, when he was replaced by Tony Lewis. He was also Chairman of the MCC's "England Committee", which was an administrative role and was awarded the CBE in the 2001 New Year Honours.

Style

Dexter's power amazed everyone who had not had the joy of watching him in other innings in England and in Perth. He took chances – thank goodness for those who look on batting as a challenge! – but he made superb strokes, with his driving tremendous in power and placement. Sometimes, in fact, the placement didn't matter so much because the power sent the ball through men recognized as outstanding fielders. Once such stroke, a cover-drive, was through Thomas's legs just as he got his hands there. I felt glad that the ball went between his legs and that his hands were not behind it. Not even Jehu drove more furiously than Dexter, and a direct hit on the leg or hands might well have put this accomplished fieldsman out of action.
Johnnie Moyes

Ted Dexter was a cavalier batsman in the old amateur style and a ferocious strokemaker, but was known as being moody and mercurial. As a batsman he could leave the hands of the fielders team bruised and reddened with his powerful drives and cuts.  To see "Lord Ted" thrashing the fast bowling was one of the most thrilling sights in cricket and he could make any run chase look possible. His great fault was that he seldom gave a bowling attack due respect and got himself out with rash strokes. Though more a batsman than a bowler he could seam and swing the ball, was a useful third paceman even at Test level and was an excellent fielder anywhere. Dexter was a natural one-day player, where his big hitting, tidy bowling, keen fielding and lively captaincy gave Sussex their first two trophies – the inaugural Gillette Cup in 1963 and again in 1964. He devised innovative field placings for limited overs games and his 'ideas changed the game forever. It is no exaggeration to say that Dexter was the man who shaped modern cricket'. In first-class matches he bored easily and his strokes of genius were in the end outweighed by his mistakes. As captain he had "more theories than Charles Darwin", sometimes shifting fielders on a whim and was hailed as a genius if a wicket fell as a result. He was dictatorial on the field, rarely consulting with his bowlers about field placings and pulling them off by saying "You've had enough now. Get down to third man"

Outside cricket

Ted Dexter's wife arrived in Australia. Ted's wife was a looker and a model. She is a very lovely lady, but on hearing of her arrival, when Ted faced the press, the majority of questions posed were about his wife...during an England cricket team press conference! 
Fred Trueman

Dexter married Susan Longfield on 2 May 1959 . She was the daughter of a former Kent cricketer Tom Longfield, whom he met at a party at Cambridge University while still an undergraduate and decided to marry on sight.

She worked as a model and she joined her husband on the tour of Australia in 1962–63, where she generated considerable press interest and earned more than any of the cricketers. They had a son Thomas and a daughter Genevieve.

Dexter was a talented golfer, an amateur champion, and some believe could have achieved success in that sport if he had not chosen cricket.<ref>Gregory, Kenneth (1986), "Cricketers in Other Fields, p. 640 in E. W. Swanton ed. The Barclays World of Cricket, Collins</ref> In Australia in 1962–1963 he played a foursome with Norman Von Nida, Jack Nicklaus and Gary Player (with Colin Cowdrey as his caddy) and they offered to take him to America to become a tournament golfer, but Dexter declined. He also went on to win the President's Putter three times in his career.

Dexter owned Jaguar cars, Norton motorbikes, greyhounds, race horses and in 1970 piloted his Aztec BPA-23 Pommies Progress to Australia with his family to cover the Ashes as a journalist, covering 12,000 miles and making 24 stops. 

Dexter launched his own PR company, which ran for many years and briefly became a television cricket commentator, alongside Richie Benaud and Denis Compton. He wrote a weekly column on cricket for The Observer, and then, more lucratively, for the Sunday Mirror.

His fondness for horse racing exceeded even that of Gary Sobers and Brian Close. He carried a then rare portable television to watch races in cricket dressing rooms and once declared a Sussex innings from Brighton Racecourse.

He co-wrote with Clifford Makins the crime novel Testkill (1976) where an Australian bowler is murdered during play at a Test match against England at Lord's.

In December 2012, on BBC One's Antiques Roadshow, Dexter appeared with expert Paul Atterbury who confessed to having held Dexter as a personal hero since childhood. Dexter explained that his father, Major R. M. Dexter, had been an officer with the Royal Artillery's 84th Brigade Royal Field Artillery and had lived through the Battle of the Somme. He was the only serving officer who enlisted at the start of the war to have survived until the end, and had been awarded the Military Cross, a medal which had now been stolen.

 Death 
Dexter died on 25 August 2021 at the age of 86 in Wolverhampton due to an age-related illness. He left a widow Susan (whom he married in 1959), a son, daughter and several grandchildren. In a statement following his death, Marylebone Cricket Club described him as "one of England's greatest ever cricketers". England players wore black armbands as a tribute during the second day of the third test match of the series between India and England at Headingley.

Statistics

See also
 List of Test cricketers born in non-Test playing nations

References

Cited sources
 Eager, Patrick and Ross, Alan (1989) Tour of Tours, Border's Victorious Australians of 1989, Hodder and Stoughton.
 Moyes, Johnnie and Goodman, Tom (1965) With the M.C.C. in Australia 1962–63, A Critical Story of the Tour, The Sportsmans Book Club.
Snow, John (1976) Cricket rebel, an Autobiography. The Hamlyn Publishing Group Ltd. p. 25. .
 Titmus, Fred (2005) My Life in Cricket, John Blake Publishing Ltd.
 Trueman, Fred (2004) As It Was, The Memoirs of Fred Trueman, Pan Books.

Further reading

 Trevor Bailey, Richie Benaud, Colin Cowdrey and Jim Laker The Lord's Taverners Fifty Greatest, Heinemann-Quixote, 1983
 John Campbell Clark, Challenge renewed. The M.C.C. tour of Australia, 1962-3,
 Ted Dexter, Ted Dexter's Cricket Book, Arthur Barker, 1963
 Ted Dexter (Ed), Rothmans Book of Test Matches: England v. Australia, 1946–1963, Arthur Barker, 1964
 Ted Dexter, Ted Dexter Declares – An Autobiography, Stanley Paul, 1966
 Ted Dexter and Ian Wooldrige, The International Cavaliers' World of Cricket, Purnell, 1970
 Ted Dexter and Michael McDonnell World of Golf, Littlehampton Book Services, 1970
 Ted Dexter and Clifford Makins, Testkill, Allen & Unwin, 1976
 Ted Dexter and Clifford Makins, Deadly Putter, Allen & Unwin, 1979
 Ted Dexter, From Bradman to Boycott, The Master Batsmen, Queen Anne Press, 1981
 Ted Dexter, My Golf, Arthur Barker, 1982
 Ted Dexter, You Can Play Cricket, Severn House Publishers, 1982
 Ted Dexter and David Lemmon, Walk to the Wicket, Allen and Unwin, 1984
 Ted Dexter and Ralph Dellor, Ted Dexter's Little Cricket Book, A Collection of Inspirational Anecdotes, Bloomsbury Publishing, 1996
 David Frith, England Versus Australia: An Illustrated History of Every Test Match Since 1877, Viking, 2007
 Alan Lee, Lord Ted: The Dexter Enigma, Gollancz/Witherby, 1995
 Derek Lodge, The Test Match Career of Ted Dexter, Spellmount Publishers, 1989
 E. M. Wellings, Dexter v Benaud (MCC tour, Australia 1962–63)'', Bailey Brothers & Swinfen, 1963

External links
Cricketer of the Year, 1961

Ted Dexter's internet blog on current cricket issues

1935 births
2021 deaths
English cricketers of 1946 to 1968
England Test cricket captains
Sussex cricket captains
Cambridge University cricketers
International Cavaliers cricketers
Marylebone Cricket Club cricketers
Gentlemen cricketers
Wisden Cricketers of the Year
English cricket administrators
Presidents of the Marylebone Cricket Club
Commanders of the Order of the British Empire
English cricket commentators
Alumni of Jesus College, Cambridge
People educated at Radley College
11th Hussars officers
British Army personnel of the Malayan Emergency
England cricket team selectors
Gentlemen of England cricketers
Conservative Party (UK) parliamentary candidates
British sportsperson-politicians
English cricketers
A. E. R. Gilligan's XI cricketers
T. N. Pearce's XI cricketers
Marylebone Cricket Club Australian Touring Team cricketers
England Test cricketers